Impractical Jokers UK is a British reality television series that first aired in the United Kingdom in 2012 on BBC Three. The series is based on the American hidden camera-practical joke reality television series Impractical Jokers. Throughout the show they challenge their friends to do and to say embarrassing things to an unsuspecting public.

The first two series of the show aired on BBC Three in 2012 and 2014, featuring Paul McCaffrey, Joel Dommett, Marek Larwood, and Roisin Conaty.

In April 2015, Channel 5 and Comedy Central announced a new series starring Lee Griffiths, Matt Ralph, Paul Biggin, and David Moon, replacing the previous four comedians. Matt Edmondson is the narrator.

Format
Before every challenge, the guys explain where they are, what the challenge is, and what will happen if they fail. There is a mic placed on the cast member performing the prank. There are also hidden cameras near the area to capture the action. The location in which the challenge takes place is usually a public area such as a park, shopping centre, or store. The criteria of each challenge are the same for each of the jokers competing in the round. If the joker cannot complete their task, they get a Thumbs-Down. At the end of the episode, the joker(s) with the most thumbs down is punished, and the punishments are usually more embarrassing, humiliating, disgusting, painful or scary than any of the challenges. Punishments cannot be refused, or the joker will be kicked off the show.

Episodes

Before every challenge, there is a hidden camera and mic placed on the cast-member performing the prank. The location in which the challenge takes place is usually a public area such as a high street or store. Although the criteria of each challenge is the same for each of the four comedians.

BBC Three (2012–2014)
Two series of Impractical Jokers UK aired on BBC Three in 2012 and 2014, featuring comedians Paul McCaffrey, Joel Dommett, Marek Larwood, and Roisin Conaty.

Channel 5/Comedy Central (2016)
For the third and final series, the show starred Lee Griffiths, Matt Ralph, Paul Biggin, and David Moon with Matt Edmondson providing the voiceover.

Robert Gray, director of Yalli Productions said: "We were thrilled to be making Impractical Jokers UK with Comedy Central UK. Lee, Matt, David and Paul have known each other for 12 years."

Reception
VultureHound's Laura Zoe Fleming gave it a 1/5, saying that while it is very similar to its American counterpart, the show seems too forced and the jokes are not funny at all. She added, "The four jokers, although, funny at times, just don't have the chemistry that is needed to make something like this work, it just makes watching it very cringey and leaves you finding yourself staring at the wall for the rest of the show because it's less painful to watch."

References

External links
 

2012 British television series debuts
2016 British television series endings
2010s British comedy television series
2010s British reality television series
BBC television comedy
BBC reality television shows
British television series based on American television series
Comedy Central (British TV channel) original programming
English-language television shows
Hidden camera television series
British television series revived after cancellation
Impractical Jokers